Roger Bosworth also Robert (ca. 16071660) was an English physician and politician who sat in the House of Commons  from 1659 to 1660.

Bosworth was from a lesser gentry family of Woolhope, Herefordshire. He studied medicine at Brasenose College, Oxford and was made Doctor Regio Beneficio on 31 January 1643 and  created D.Med. on 4 March. 1643. He practiced medicine in Hereford. 

In 1659, Bosworth was elected Member of Parliament for Hereford in the Third Protectorate Parliament. He was re-elected MP for Hereford in April 1660 for the Convention Parliament.

References

1607 births
1660 deaths
17th-century English medical doctors
English MPs 1659
English MPs 1660